Gebhard Leberecht von Blücher, Fürst von Wahlstatt (21 December 1742 – 12 September 1819), Graf (count), later elevated to Fürst (sovereign prince) von Wahlstatt, was a Prussian Generalfeldmarschall (field marshal). He earned his greatest recognition after leading his army against Napoleon I at the Battle of the Nations at Leipzig in 1813 and the Battle of Waterloo in 1815.

Blücher was born in Rostock, the son of a retired army captain. His military career began in 1758 as a hussar in the Swedish Army. He was captured by the Prussians in 1760 during the Pomeranian Campaign and thereafter joined the Prussian Army, serving as a hussar officer for Prussia during the remainder of the Seven Years' War. In 1773, Blücher was forced to resign by Frederick the Great for insubordination. He worked as a farmer until the death of Frederick in 1786, when Blücher was reinstated and promoted to colonel. For his success in the French Revolutionary Wars, Blücher became a major general in 1794. He became a lieutenant general in 1801 and commanded the cavalry corps during the Napoleonic Wars in 1806.

War broke out between Prussia and France again in 1813 and Blücher returned to active service at the age of 71. He was appointed full general over the Prussian field forces and clashed with Napoleon at the Battles of Lützen and Bautzen. Later he won a critical victory over the French at the Battle of Katzbach. Blücher commanded the Prussian Army of Silesia at the Battle of the Nations where Napoleon was decisively defeated. For his role, Blücher was made a field marshal and received his title of Prince of Wahlstatt. After Napoleon’s return in 1815, Blücher took command of the Prussian Army of the Lower Rhine and coordinated his force with that of the British and Allied forces under the Duke of Wellington. At the Battle of Ligny, he was severely injured and the Prussians retreated. After recovering, Blücher resumed command and joined Wellington at the Battle of Waterloo, with the intervention of Blücher's army playing a decisive role in the final allied victory.

Blücher was made an honorary citizen of Berlin, Hamburg and Rostock. Known for his fiery personality, he was nicknamed Marschall Vorwärts ("Marshal Forward") by his soldiers because of his aggressive approach in warfare. Along with Paul von Hindenburg, he was the most highly decorated Prussian-German soldier in history: Blücher and Hindenburg are the only Prussian-German military officers to have been awarded the Star of the Grand Cross of the Iron Cross. A statue once stood in the square that bore his name, Blücherplatz, in Breslau (today Wrocław).

Biography

Early life
Blücher was born on 21 December 1742 in Rostock, a Baltic port in northern Germany, then in the Duchy of Mecklenburg-Schwerin. His father Christian Friedrich von Blücher (1696–1761), was a retired army captain, and his family belonged to the nobility and had been landowners in northern Germany since at least the 13th century. His mother was Dorothea Maria von Zülow (1702–1769), who also belonged to an old noble family from Mecklenburg.

Gebhard began his military career at the age of 16,  when he joined the Swedish Army as a hussar. At the time, Sweden was at war with Prussia in the Seven Years' War. Blücher took part in the Pomeranian campaign of 1760, where Prussian hussars captured him in a skirmish. The colonel of the Prussian regiment, Wilhelm Sebastian von Belling (a distant relative), was impressed with the young hussar and had him join his own regiment.

Blücher took part in the later battles of the Seven Years' War, and as a hussar officer, gained much experience in light cavalry work. In peace, however, his ardent spirit led him into excesses of all kinds, such as the mock execution of a priest suspected of supporting Polish uprisings in 1772. As a result, he was passed over for promotion to major. Blücher submitted a rude letter of resignation in 1773, which Frederick the Great replied to with "Captain Blücher can take himself to the devil" (1773).

Blücher settled down to farming. Within 15 years, he had acquired financial independence and had become a Freemason. During Frederick the Great's lifetime, Blücher could not return to the army. However, the monarch died in 1786, and the following year, Blücher was reinstated as a major in his old regiment, the Red Hussars. He took part in the expedition to the Netherlands in 1787, and the next year was promoted to lieutenant colonel. In 1789, he received Prussia's highest military order, the Pour le Mérite, and in 1794, he became colonel of the Red Hussars. In 1793 and 1794, Blücher distinguished himself in cavalry actions against the French, and for his victory at Kirrweiler on 28 May 1794, he was promoted to major general. In 1801, he was made a lieutenant general.

Napoleonic Wars

Blücher was one of the leaders of the war party in Prussia in 1805, and he served as a cavalry general in the disastrous campaign of 1806. At the double Battle of Jena-Auerstedt, Blücher fought at Auerstedt, repeatedly leading the charges of the Prussian cavalry, but without success. During the retreat of the broken armies, he commanded the rearguard composed of Frederick Louis, Prince of Hohenlohe's corps. With the capitulation of the main body after the Battle of Prenzlau on 28 October, he found his march toward the north-east blocked. He led the remnant of his corps away to the north-west. Reinforcing his numbers with a division previously commanded by Karl August, Grand Duke of Saxe-Weimar, Blücher and his new chief of staff, Gerhard von Scharnhorst, reorganised his forces into two small corps totaling 21,000 men and 44 cannons. Nevertheless, he was defeated by two French corps at the Battle of Lübeck  on 6 November. The next day, trapped against the Danish frontier by 40,000 French troops, he was compelled to surrender with less than 10,000 soldiers at Ratekau. Blücher insisted that clauses be written in the capitulation document that he had had to surrender due to lack of provisions and ammunition, and that his soldiers should be honoured by a French formation along the street. He was allowed to keep his sabre and to move freely, bound only by his word of honour. He was soon exchanged for future Marshal Claude Victor-Perrin, Duc de Belluno, and was actively employed in Pomerania, at Berlin, and at Königsberg until the conclusion of the war.

After the war, Blücher was looked upon as the natural leader of the Patriot Party, with which he was in close touch during the period of Napoleonic domination, but his hopes of an alliance with Austria in the war of 1809 were disappointed. In this year, he was made general of cavalry. In 1812, he expressed himself so openly on the alliance of Russia with France that he was recalled from his military governorship of Pomerania and virtually banished from the court.

Following the start of the War of Liberation in the spring of 1813, Blücher was again placed in high command, and he was present at Lützen and Bautzen. During the summer truce, he worked on the organisation of the Prussian forces; when the war was resumed, he became commander-in-chief of the Army of Silesia, with August von Gneisenau and Karl von Müffling as his principal staff officers and 40,000 Prussians and 50,000 Russians under his command during the autumn campaign. The most conspicuous military quality displayed by Blücher was his unrelenting energy.

The irresolution and divergence of interests usual in Sixth Coalition armies found in him a restless opponent. Knowing that if he could not induce others to co-operate, he was prepared to attempt the task at hand by himself, which often caused other generals to follow his lead. He defeated Marshal MacDonald at the Katzbach, and by his victory over Marshal Marmont at Möckern led the way to the decisive defeat of Napoleon at the Battle of the Nations at Leipzig. Blücher's own army stormed Leipzig on the evening of the last day of the battle. This was the fourth battle between Napoleon and Blücher, and the first that Blücher had won.

On the day of Möckern (16 October 1813), Blücher was made a field marshal, and after the victory, he pursued the French with his accustomed energy. In the winter of 1813–1814, Blücher, with his chief staff officers, was mainly instrumental in inducing the Coalition sovereigns to carry the war into France itself.

The Battle of Brienne and the Battle of La Rothière were the chief incidents of the first stage of the celebrated 1814 campaign in north-east France, and they were quickly followed by victories of Napoleon over Blücher at Champaubert, Vauchamps, and Montmirail. The courage of the Prussian leader was undiminished, though, and his victory against the vastly outnumbered French, at Laon (9 and 10 March) practically decided the fate of the campaign. However, his health had been severely affected by the strains of the previous two months, and he now suffered a breakdown, during which he lost his sight and suffered a delusion that a Frenchman had impregnated him with an elephant. Dominic Lieven wrote that the breakdown, "revealed the fragility of the coalition armies' command structure and just how much the Army of Silesia had depended on Blücher's drive, courage, and charisma.... The result was that for more than a week after the battle of Laon, the Army of Silesia... played no useful role in the war".

After this, Blücher infused some of his energy into the operations of the Prince Schwarzenberg's Army of Bohemia, and at last this army and the Army of Silesia marched in one body directly towards Paris. The victory of Montmartre, the entry of the allies into the French capital, and the overthrow of the First Empire were the direct consequences.

Blücher was in favour of punishing the city of Paris severely for the sufferings of Prussia at the hands of the French armies, but the allied commanders intervened. According to the Duke of Wellington, one of Blücher's plans involved blowing up the Jena Bridge near the Champ de Mars:

In gratitude for his victories in 1814, King Frederick William III of Prussia created Blücher Prince (Fürst) of Wahlstatt (in Silesia on the Katzbach battlefield). The king also awarded him estates near Krieblowitz (now Krobielowice, Poland) in Lower Silesia and a grand mansion at 2, Pariser Platz in Berlin (which in 1930 became the Embassy of the United States, Berlin). Soon afterward, Blücher paid a visit to England, where he was received with royal honours and cheered enthusiastically everywhere he went.

When Oxford University granted him an honorary doctorate (doctor of laws), he is supposed to have joked that if he was made a doctor, they should at least make Gneisenau an apothecary; "...for if I wrote the prescription, he made the pills."

Hundred Days and later life

After the war, Frederick William III gave Blücher properties in the area of Neustadt (now Prudnik). In November of the same year, Blücher leased Kunzendorf, Mühlsdorf, Wackenau and Achthuben to a local farmer, Hübner, in exchange for 2,000 thalers, rolls of linen cloth and yarn. His wife also moved to Kunzendorf. While living in the area of Neustadt, he financed the families of the fallen soldiers, gave a few liters of beer to the local parish priest every day, and paid a doctor from Neustadt to treat the poor. Thanks to his efforts, a health resort called "Blücher's Spring" was established in Kunzendorf (it was destroyed together with the castle as a result of the battles of the Neustadt in 1945).

After the war, Blücher retired to Silesia. However, the return of Napoleon from Elba and his entry into Paris at the start of the Hundred Days, called him back to service. He was put in command of the Army of the Lower Rhine, with Gneisenau serving again as his chief of staff. At the outset of the Waterloo Campaign of 1815, the Prussians sustained a serious defeat at Ligny (16 June), in the course of which the old field marshal lay trapped under his dead horse for several hours and was repeatedly ridden over by cavalry, his life saved only by the devotion of his aide-de-camp Count Nostitz, who threw a greatcoat over his commander  to obscure Blücher's rank and identity from the passing French. As Blücher was unable to resume command for some hours, Gneisenau took command, drew off the defeated army, and rallied it. In spite of Gneisenau's distrust of Wellington, he obeyed Blücher's last orders to direct the army's retreat towards Wavre, rather than Liège, to keep alive the possibility of joining the Prussian and Wellington's Anglo-allied armies together.

After bathing his wounds in a liniment of rhubarb and garlic, and fortified by a liberal internal dose of schnapps, Blücher rejoined his army. Gneisenau feared that the British had reneged on their earlier agreements and favored a withdrawal, but Blücher convinced him to send two corps to join Wellington at Waterloo. He then led his army on a tortuous march along muddy paths, arriving on the field of Waterloo in the late afternoon.  In spite of his age, the pain of his wounds, and the effort it must have taken for him to remain on horseback, Bernard Cornwell states that several soldiers attested to Blücher's high spirits and his determination to defeat Napoleon:

With the battle hanging in the balance, Blücher's army intervened with decisive and crushing effect, his vanguard drawing off Napoleon's badly needed reserves, and his main body being instrumental in crushing French resistance. This victory led the way to a decisive victory through the relentless pursuit of the French by the Prussians. The two Coalition armies entered Paris on 7 July.

Blücher remained in the French capital for a few months, but his age and infirmities compelled him to retire to his Silesian residence at Krieblowitz.  At the invitation of the British government, he made another state visit to England, to be formally thanked for  his army and his role in the Waterloo Campaign.  When his carriage stopped on Blackheath Hill, overlooking London, he is said to have exclaimed, "What a city to sack!" He died at Krieblowitz on 12 September 1819, aged 76. After his death, an imposing mausoleum was built for his remains.

When Krieblowitz was conquered by the Red Army in 1945, Soviet soldiers broke into the Blücher mausoleum and scattered the remains. Soviet troops reportedly used his skull as a football. After 1989, some of his remains were taken by a Polish priest and interred in the catacomb of the church in Sośnica (German: Schosnitz), three km from the now Polish Krobielowice.

Assessment
Napoleon characterized him as a very brave soldier with no talent as a general but he admired his attitude, which he described as a bull that looks all around him with rolling eyes and, when he sees danger, charges. Napoleon thought of him as stubborn and untiring, knowing no fear. He called him an old rascal who would be always get up on his feet again and be ready for the next battle as, following a sound defeat, Blücher had, almost instantly, returned to attack him vigorously again. 

It was to be said later among the Prussian military that Blücher established "a Prussian way of war" that had abiding influence:

More generally,  Blücher was a courageous and popular general who  "had much to be proud of: energy, controlled aggression and a commitment to defeating the enemy army."

Campaigns
1760: Pomeranian Campaign (as Swedish soldier; captured by Prussia; changed sides)
Seven Years' War
1787: Expedition to the Netherlands with Red Hussars
1793–1794: French campaigns with Red Hussars
1806: Auerstedt, Pomerania, Berlin, Königsberg
1813: Lützen, Bautzen, Katzbach, Möckern, Leipzig
1814: Brienne, La Rothière, Champaubert, Vauchamps, Château-Thierry, Montmirail, Laon, Montmartre
1815: Lower Rhine (Battle of Ligny), Battle of Waterloo

Publications

His campaign journal covering the years 1793 to 1794 was published in 1796:
Kampagne-Journal der Jahre 1793 und 1794 (Berlin: Decker, 1796)

A second edition of this diary, together with some of Blücher's letters, was published in 1914:
Vorwärts! Ein Husaren-Tagebuch und Feldzugsbriefe von Gebhardt Leberecht von Blücher, introduced by General Field Marshal von der Goltz, edited by Heinrich Conrad (Munich: G. Müller, [1914])

His collected writings and letters (together with those of Yorck and Gneisenau) appeared in 1932:
Gesammelte Schriften und Briefe / Blücher, Yorck, Gneisenau, compiled and edited by Edmund Th. Kauer (Berlin-Schöneberg: Oestergaard, [1932])

Ancestry

Family and descendants 
Blücher was married twice: in 1773 to Karoline Amalie von Mehling (1756–1791) and, after her death, in 1795 to Katharine Amalie von Colomb (1772–1850), sister of General Peter von Colomb. While this second marriage was without issue, by his first marriage Blücher had seven children, of whom two sons and a daughter survived infancy,

 Franz Ferdinand Joachim (1778–1829), major general in the Prussian army, wounded in battle in 1813 and thereafter mentally ill;
 Friedrich Gebhardt Lebrecht (1780–1834);
 Bernhardine Friederike (1786–1870).

The marshal's grandson, Count Gebhard Bernhard von Blücher (1799–1875), was created Prince Blücher of Wahlstatt (Serene Highness) in Prussia, a hereditary title in primogeniture, the other members of his branch bearing the title count or countess. In 1832, he bought Raduň Castle in the Opava District and in 1847 the lands at Wahlstatt, Legnickie Pole, all of which remained in the family until the flight and expulsion of Germans from Poland and Czechoslovakia in 1945, which forced the family into exile in their mansion Havilland Hall in Guernsey, acquired by the 4th prince and his English wife, Evelyn, Princess Blücher. Later the family moved to Eurasburg, Bavaria. The present head of the House of Blücher von Wahlstatt is Nicolaus, 8th Prince Blücher of Wahlstatt (born 1932), the heir apparent is his son, hereditary count Lukas (born 1956).

Honours 
He received the following orders and decorations:

Legacy

Museum
The Rhineland town of Kaub has a museum dedicated to Blücher, commemorating in particular his crossing the Rhine with the Prussian and Russian armies, on New Year's night 1813–1814, in pursuit of the French.

Statues 
After Blücher's death, statues were erected to his memory at Berlin, Breslau, Rostock, and Kaub (where his troops crossed the Rhine in pursuit of Napoleon's forces in 1813).

Blücher is honoured with a bust in the Walhalla temple near Regensburg.

Locomotive and ships

In gratitude for Blücher's service, George Stephenson, the pioneering British locomotive engineer, named a locomotive after him. The small mining village a few miles from Stephenson's birth place in Wylam also bears the name Blucher in honour of him. 

The Blucher was named after him, after the original ship was captured by the British and the new owners named it for him.

Three ships of the German navy have been named in honour of Blücher. The first to be so named was the corvette , built at Kiel's Norddeutsche Schiffbau AG (later renamed the Krupp-Germaniawerft) and launched 20 March 1877. Taken out of service after a boiler explosion in 1907, she ended her days as a coal freighter in Vigo, Spain.

On 11 April 1908, the Panzerkreuzer SMS Blücher was launched from the Imperial Shipyard in Kiel. This ship was sunk on 24 January 1915 in the First World War at the Battle of Dogger Bank.

The Second World War German heavy cruiser Blücher was completed in September 1939, and pronounced ready for service on 5 April 1940 after completing a series of sea trials and training exercises. The vessel was sunk four days later near Oslo during the invasion of Norway.

Film portrayals
Blücher was played by German actor Otto Gebühr in the 1929 film Waterloo.  In 1932, he was the subject of the biographical film Marshal Forwards, in which he was played by Paul Wegener. It was part of a group of Prussian films released during the era.

He was portrayed by Soviet actor Sergo Zakariadze in the 1970 Soviet-Italian film Waterloo.

Various
Blücher also has a boarding house named after him at Berkshire based Wellington College. The Blucher, as it is known, is a boys' house renowned for sporting and academic prowess.

A popular German idiom, geht ran wie Blücher ("charge like Blücher"), meaning that someone is taking very direct and aggressive action, in war or otherwise, refers to Blücher. The full German saying, now obsolete, relates to the Battle of the Katzbach in 1813: "Der geht ran wie Blücher an der Katzbach!" ("He's advancing like Blücher at Katzbach!"), referring to Blücher and describing vigorous, forceful behaviour.

Vasily Blyukher's last name was given to his family by a landlord in honour of Gebhard.

Near Twickenham Stadium is the Prince Blucher pub.

See also
Evelyn Princess Blücher
Blücher Order
Blucher shoe
Blüchern
Brothers von Blücher

Notes

References

Sources

 — The pages numbers are given as offsets in the electronic view, these will vary from the page numbers in a physical book 

 

Attribution

Further reading

 Eyck, Erich. "Marshal Blücher" History Today (1951) 1#9 pp 41–47. online

External links
 
 Blüchers Zug von Auerstedt bis Ratekau und Lübecks Schreckenstage (1806) – German publication about Blücher
  This source gives  "Black Hussars" for the name of his old regiment (altered in the 11th edition to "Red Hussars").

1742 births
1819 deaths
People from the Duchy of Mecklenburg-Schwerin
Field marshals of Prussia
Prussian military personnel of the Seven Years' War
Prussian commanders of the Napoleonic Wars
German princes
German Freemasons
Recipients of the Pour le Mérite (military class)
Recipients of the Iron Cross (1813)
Recipients of the Grand Cross of the Iron Cross
Recipients of the Order of St. George of the First Degree
Recipients of the Order of St. Anna, 1st class
Recipients of the Gold Sword for Bravery
Grand Crosses of the Military Order of Maria Theresa
Knights Grand Cross of the Military Order of William
Honorary Knights Grand Cross of the Order of the Bath
Military personnel from Rostock